General elections were held in Jordan on 10 November 2020 to elect the members of the nineteenth House of Representatives. Voter turnout was just 29.88%, the lowest in a decade.

The elections took place as the country was experiencing a surge in COVID-19 cases. As a result there were numerous calls on social media channels to boycott the elections, particularly as no alternatives to in-person voting were offered. The country went into a four-day total lockdown following elections, starting at 23:00 on election day, an hour later than the originally-stated 22:00. According to Washington Post, "wealthy business executives and tribal independents dominated, while strong, reform-oriented members of parliament lost their seats."

Electoral system
The 130 seats in the House of Representatives consist of 115 members elected by open list proportional representation from 23 constituencies of between three and nine seats in size and 15 seats reserved for women. Nine of the 115 proportional representation seats are reserved for the Christian minority, with another three reserved for the Chechen and Circassian minorities.

There were 15 seats reserved for women who received the most votes but failed to be elected on their list in each of the twelve governorates and the three Badia districts.

Contesting parties
A total of 294 party lists with 1,703 candidates contested the elections, including the Islamic Action Front, an offshoot of the Muslim Brotherhood, and the "Progressive" list, a coalition of socialist and nationalist parties including the Arab Ba'ath Progressive Party, Jordanian Arab Socialist Ba'ath Party, Jordanian Communist Party, Jordanian Democratic People's Party and the Jordanian Democratic Popular Unity Party.

Conduct
Polls opened at 07:00, and were supposed to close at 19:00. However the closing was extended by two hours, with the voting window totalling 14 hours. The Independent Elections Commission has denied that the time extension was due to low turnout.

More than 4.5 million Jordanians were eligible to vote in 23 constituencies. But only 1.38 million people, or 29.9 percent, voted – down from 36 percent turnout in 2016.

Results

According to Washington Post, "wealthy business executives and tribal independents dominated, while strong, reform-oriented members of parliament lost their seats. Broader-based coalitions fared poorly. Less than 10 percent of the 130 members of the next parliament will be from political parties. The most influential opposition party, the IAF, lost almost half of its seats. No women were elected beyond the 15-seat quota allotted them, though five had done so in the last election. Only 15 percent of those elected are under 40". A total of 1,387,698 votes have been cast, corresponding to a turnout of 29.88%.

References

Jordanian general election
General election
Elections in Jordan
Election and referendum articles with incomplete results